Croatia Records is the largest major record label in Croatia, based in Zagreb (Dubrava).

Summary
Croatia Records d.d. is a joint-stock company currently led by the chief executive officer Želimir Babogredac, a notable sound engineer. It releases mostly (but not necessarily) mainstream music, and it has signed many prominent Croatian musicians of various music genres such as Dražen Zečić, Arsen Dedić, Mišo Kovač, Josipa Lisac, Majke, Teška Industrija, Thompson, Maksim Mrvica, Crvena jabuka, Jelena Rozga, Novi fosili, Opća opasnost, Rade Šerbedžija, Jacques Houdek, Parni valjak, Leteći odred, Mladen Grdović, Dino Dvornik, Dino Merlin, Hari Rončević, Radojka Šverko, Giuliano, Mate Bulić, Disciplin A Kitschme, Srebrna krila, Divlje jagode, Indexi, Sinan Alimanović, Lu Jakelić, Mia Dimšić, Mia Negovetić, Nina Donelli and others. Today, Croatia Records claims to have 70% share of the Croatian music market and has 30 record shops. Being a continuation of Jugoton, from which it inherited a comprehensive audio and video collection, Croatia Records is also active in re-releasing numerous digitally remastered former Yugoslav pop and rock titles. Following the global retro trend, the company decided to re-introduce gramophone records as well.

History

The company that is today Croatia Records was founded in 1947 in Zagreb, the capital of the then-People's Republic of Croatia under the name Jugoton, a publicly owned company which was the largest record label and chain record store in the former SFR Yugoslavia. During several decades of its successful existence, Jugoton signed many eminent ex-Yugoslav artists such as: Indexi, Bijelo Dugme, Električni Orgazam, Haustor, Idoli and Leb i Sol, and also numerous important foreign stars for the domestic market including: Elvis Presley, The Beatles, Rolling Stones, Madonna, U2, David Bowie, Queen, Deep Purple, Pink Floyd, Iron Maiden, Kraftwerk, Depeche Mode etc. The company also owned a chain of record shops across Yugoslavia. Many Yugoslav entries in the Eurovision Song Contest were signed with Jugoton including the 1989 winners Riva.

Croatian independence
After the transition from socialist state to parliamentary democracy in 1989, the question of Croatia's self-determination from Yugoslavia was raised. In 1991, shortly before the declaration of Croatian independence and the breakup of Yugoslavia, the company's name Jugoton, a portmanteau word of Jugoslavija (Yugoslavia) and tone, was changed to Croatia Records. The company was inherited by the now-independent Republic of Croatia and since the previous economic system was abandoned, it was privatized. Since the year of 2000, Croatia Records is managed by professionals from the music industry joined in the partnership company called AUTOR d.o.o. In 2001, the musician Miroslav Škoro became the leader of Croatia Records, until his resignation in 2006.

Croatia Records Music Publishing

Croatia Records Music Publishing (CRMP d.o.o.) is a company owned by Croatia Records d.d. that specializes in the regulation of conditions of use of copyright music and digital distribution. Their activities include regulating the conditions of using music in media, advertising campaigns, on film, in the mobile industry, legal protection and promotion of copyright work, cooperation with a discography, associations for the collective protection of copyright and related rights.

Founded in 1947. as a copyright department of former Jugoton and Since 1991 as a part of a major label house Croatia Records, today Croatia Records Music Publishing stands as an independent company. Croatia Records Music Publishing has the largest catalog of Croatian songs and the largest catalog of master recordings made in the last 40 years of the most famous Croatian singers, songwriters and composers such as Arsen Dedić, Đorđe Novković, Damir Urban, Nenad Ninčević, Zlatan Stipišić - Gibonni, Zdenko Runjić.

Croatia Records Music Publishing has begun digitization of musical works issued by Croatia Records and is developing relationships between advertising agencies and production companies in the regulation of all rights necessary for the commercial exploitation of music. It also works on digital distribution of music in direct cooperation with the iTunes, Rebeat GMBH, Roba Music Verlag and other similar online stores.

Controversy
Often, the company was a target of public criticism on various issues.

Croatia Records has been the object of a controversy raised by singer Branimir Štulić over royalty rights. Štulić claims royalties of songs by former rock band Azra, whose lead singer and songwriter he was in the 1980s, and which was then managed by Croatia Record's predecessor Jugoton. Štulić has named a sum of 12 million Euros he believes the company owes him but has not opted to take legal action to claim it. Želimir Babogredac replied that Croatia Records has all the legal rights to release titles by Štulić and Azra, as the company is a direct successor of Jugoton, whom these artists were signed for. He also said that the sum Štulić claims is exaggerated. However, he added that Croatia Records is proud to have the highly acclaimed Štulić in the list of its artists and that he may receive a payment from the sale of audio CDs only if he joins the Croatian Composers' Society (ZAMP).

See also
Suzy Records
Menart Records
Music of Croatia
Croatian popular music
List of record labels

References

External links
Croatia Records Official site
 Croatia Records Music Publishing official website
Croatia Records at Facebook
Croatian Roots Music - Roots music edition of Croatia Records
Croatia Records USA - Distributor for the United States and Canada
Croatia Records at Discogs

 
Record labels established in 1947
Croatian record labels
IFPI members
Companies based in Zagreb